Paweł Mateusz Woicki (born 19 June 1983) is a Polish professional volleyball coach and former player. He was a member of the Poland national team from 2005 to 2016. A participant in the Olympic Games Beijing 2008, and the 2009 European Champion. He currently serves as head coach for the Polish PlusLiga team, Cerrad Enea Czarni Radom.

Personal life
He was born in Tomaszów Mazowiecki, Poland. In 2008 he married Joanna. In 2009 his wife gave birth to their son Mateusz.

Career

Clubs
In 2013 Woicki signed a contract with Transfer Bydgoszcz. After two years he decided to move to Indykpol AZS Olsztyn.

National team
In 2009 he achieved the title of European Champion. On September 14, 2009 he was awarded the Knight's Cross of Polonia Restituta. The Order was conferred on the following day by the Prime Minister of Poland, Donald Tusk. On July 10, 2011 he won with his national team the first medal of the World League for Poland in history. They won a bronze medal after defeating Argentina. On April 2, 2015 he was appointed to the Polish national team by head coach Stephane Antiga. After the training camp in Spała he went to team B of the Polish national team led by Andrzej Kowal. He took part in the first edition of 2015 European Games. He was a captain of Poland during that tournament.

Honours

Clubs
 CEV Champions League
  2011/2012 – with PGE Skra Bełchatów
 FIVB Club World Championship
  Doha 2010 – with PGE Skra Bełchatów
 National championships
 2007/2008  Polish Cup, with AZS Częstochowa
 2010/2011  Polish Cup, with PGE Skra Bełchatów
 2010/2011  Polish Championship, with PGE Skra Bełchatów
 2011/2012  Polish Cup, with PGE Skra Bełchatów
 2012/2013  Polish SuperCup, with PGE Skra Bełchatów

Youth national team
 2003  FIVB U21 World Championship

Individual awards
 2008: Polish Cup – Best Setter

State awards
 2009:  Knight's Cross of Polonia Restituta

References

External links

 
 Player profile at PlusLiga.pl 
 
 
 Player profile at Volleybox.net

1983 births
Living people
People from Tomaszów Mazowiecki
Sportspeople from Łódź Voivodeship
Polish men's volleyball players
Polish volleyball coaches
Volleyball coaches of international teams
Olympic volleyball players of Poland
Volleyball players at the 2008 Summer Olympics
European Games competitors for Poland
Volleyball players at the 2015 European Games
Knights of the Order of Polonia Restituta
Projekt Warsaw players
AZS Częstochowa players
Resovia (volleyball) players
BKS Visła Bydgoszcz players
Skra Bełchatów players
AZS Olsztyn players
Czarni Radom players
Setters (volleyball)